Lieutenant-Colonel John Corry Wilson Daly (24 March 1796 – 1 April 1878) was a Canadian politician, businessperson, militia officer, and the first Mayor of Stratford, Ontario.

Daly was born in Liverpool, England, and educated in Ireland.  He served as a surgeon's assistant in the Royal Navy.  He moved to Stratford in 1833, becoming post-master and opening the town's first store.  He is often regarded as Stratford's founder, although he was not the first person to live there.

Until 2017, Daly was mistakenly credited with watercolour work by Caroline Louisa Daly held in Confederation Centre Art Gallery on Prince Edward Island, despite a lack of evidence that he ever painted.

References

External links 
Biography at the Dictionary of Canadian Biography Online

1796 births
1878 deaths
Mayors of Stratford, Ontario
Pre-Confederation Ontario people
Irish Anglicans
Irish emigrants to pre-Confederation Ontario
English emigrants to pre-Confederation Ontario
Politicians from Liverpool
Immigrants to Upper Canada
Canadian people of Ulster-Scottish descent